Bruno Senna Lalli (born 15 October 1983) is a Brazilian professional racing driver. He is the nephew of the late Ayrton Senna, three-time Formula One world champion. He is also the first man to win a race in every WEC class, and was the 2017 WEC world champion for the LMP2 class.

Bruno Senna raced in Formula One from 2010 to 2012. He made his debut driving for Hispania Racing in 2010, raced for Renault from August 2011 as a replacement for Nick Heidfeld, and drove for the Williams team in 2012. Between 2014 and 2016, he drove for Mahindra Racing in Formula E. His mother is Ayrton's older sister, Viviane. His father, Flávio Lalli, died in a motorcycle crash in 1996. The colour scheme of Bruno's helmet is a slightly modified version of that used by his uncle Ayrton.

Career

Early career
Born in São Paulo, he was first taught the skills of motor racing by his grandfather Milton da Silva at the age of five. Bruno raced go-karts against his uncle on the family farm, and Ayrton regarded his nephew's potential very highly. Ayrton's death while driving a Williams at the 1994 San Marino Grand Prix, however, brought Bruno's own racing career to an abrupt halt. Despite these setbacks including the death of his father in a motorbike accident in 1996, Bruno's mother and his uncle Ayrton's sister Viviane had reluctantly backed her son's interest in motor racing.

At Imola in 2004, on the 10th anniversary of his uncle's death, Senna was given an example of his uncle's 1986 Lotus 98T as a gift from an Italian friend. Senna drove the car at the 2004 Brazilian Grand Prix meeting in São Paulo, at Interlagos, where Ayrton had won in 1991 and 1993. Senna's sister, Bianca, meanwhile, has managed his affairs and sponsorship acquisition.

In 2004, Bruno competed in six races of the Formula BMW UK series for Carlin Motorsport, scoring six points.

Formula Three (2005–2006)
In 2005, he moved on to the British Formula Three Championship, driving for the Räikkönen Robertson Racing team owned by then-McLaren Formula One driver Kimi Räikkönen and his business managers David and Steve Robertson. His results included three podium finishes in the last seven races of the season, as he finished tenth in the final standings. In 2006 he stayed with the team and finished third in the series standings behind champion and teammate Mike Conway and Oliver Jarvis, taking five victories. He won the opening two races of the series at Oulton Park in the wet. He again won the first race at Donington Park and then won the second race at Mugello in Italy, again in the wet.

Senna had a massive crash during the first race of round five of the series at Snetterton. Senna's car took off just before the bridge, and may have even clipped it, while cartwheeling through the air. His car landed violently and careered along and down the safety barrier for some distance, but Senna walked away. His car however was damaged beyond immediate repair and Senna missed out on the second race of the day. On the rear wing of the car he had advertised his uncle's foundation.

In 2006, Senna competed in the Formula Three support races at the 2006 Australian Grand Prix, winning three of the four races. Driving a Spiess Opel powered Dallara F304, Senna set the Formula Three lap record of 1:50.8640 in the first race of the meeting which as of 2016 remains the fastest ever non-F1 lap of the Melbourne Grand Prix Circuit. Senna finished 3rd in the race, the only one of the 4 races he did not win over the weekend.

On 28 May Senna made his first appearance on Monaco circuit, as a guest in the Porsche Supercup event. Unfortunately, he was forced to retire at the first corner because of a clutch failure.

In October 2006 he appeared in an eight-part weekly series called Vroom Vroom on British TV station Sky One. Each week he would drive a different car being tested on the show, as quickly as possible, to the top of a multi-storey car park.

GP2 Series (2007–2008)
He signed to drive for the Red Bull-sponsored Arden International team for the 2007 GP2 Series. He finished fourth on his debut at Bahrain and soon after scored his first win in the feature race in Spain. In the single race Monaco event, Senna struggled owing to poor tyres.

During the four-week break in the GP2 series between the Monaco and French races, Senna took part in the third round of the Ferrari Challenge Trofeo Pirelli European series at Silverstone on 9 and 10 June 2007. Driving an F430 on a weekend devoted to the 60th anniversary of Ferrari, Senna won both races, starting each from pole. The purpose of this involvement was to gain a better understanding of the circuit, which is on the GP2 calendar.

At Silverstone, a mistake during qualifying on the Friday meant Senna started 26th and last. After a great start Senna was able to finish 11th in the feature race. The sprint race was not any better in terms of points with a 10th-place finish. A poor qualifying session at the Nurburgring for the feature race meant Senna started 16th but was up to ninth after a cleverly timed first pit stop. However he was given a drive-through penalty after being involved in a collision with Adam Carroll and ended up finishing a poor 15th. The Sprint race ended on the first lap after a collision. At Hungary for both races, Senna finished out of the top ten after struggling with the set-up of the car. The feature race in Turkey brought another poor result, however Senna finished sixth in the sprint race and with it came his first points since France. At Monza Senna finished fourth after starting fourteenth. Starting fifth for the sprint race Senna had an excellent start by moving up to second, however after contact with Luca Filippi resulted in bent steering, Senna managed to finish third and on the podium for the first time since France in July. At Spa Senna showed raw pace through practice and set the third fastest time early on during Qualifying for the feature race. However a stall on the grid meant he started 22nd and while fighting to make up ground he got a bit of oversteer and then the camber changed, ending his day in the tyre barrier. Starting at the back of the grid for the sprint race, Senna finished eighth leaving Belgium pointless. At the season finale in Valencia Spain, Senna ended the feature race with a DNF and thus starting the sprint race from 19th could only manage to finish 14th.  This was a positive season on the whole for Senna finishing in the top 10 in only his third full year of single seater racing, with one win and three podiums.

Senna switched teams for the 2008 season, moving to iSport International, where his teammate was Karun Chandhok.  He also drove for the team in the 2008 GP2 Asia Series. In the second round of the season at Istanbul Senna collided with a stray dog during the sprint race. The suspension of Senna's car was damaged in the incident, causing him to retire. Senna himself escaped without injury, while the dog died in the incident. Senna won the GP2 Feature race at Monte Carlo, the first time in 15 years since the Senna name has shown at the top of the leaderboards at the principality. It also moved Senna to first position in the points table, although he was to eventually finish runner-up in the championship to Giorgio Pantano.

Le Mans Series (2009)

He tested with the Mercedes-AMG DTM team, but after holding talks with the outfit he decided he did not want to commit himself to the series.

After testing an Oreca LMP1 car, Senna joined the team to race the 24 Hours of Le Mans and the Le Mans Series. His first race was the 2009 1000 km of Catalunya, teamed with Stéphane Ortelli, finishing 3rd.

Formula One

Bruno Senna sampled a contemporary Formula One car for the first time in November 2008 when he tested for Honda in Barcelona. Honda assessed the Brazilian during their first winter test at the Circuit de Catalunya on 17–19 November. His tasks included an initial familiarisation with Honda's RA108 car and its systems before progressing to a full programme during which the team intended to evaluate his performance, technical skill and ability to work within a large team organisation.

Despite Senna, over the course of the three-day test, coming to within 0.3 seconds of then Honda F1 racing driver Jenson Button, the later announcement that Honda would withdraw from Formula One with immediate effect amid the economic crisis appeared to have significantly lessened his opportunity of a 2009 race seat in Formula One, unless the squad were to find a buyer before the beginning of the season in March. Senna was expected to be the team's second driver were it to make the 2009 grid, until Rubens Barrichello was reported to have re-signed with the team. Senna decided not to sign with Mercedes for the 2009 Deutsche Tourenwagen Masters season "to focus completely on his Formula One chances". Bruno Senna said to the BBC in an interview that he did not want to negotiate with Lotus because of sentimental reasons as his uncle Ayrton Senna took his first win with Team Lotus. He also told the BBC that "I felt important to enter F1 now otherwise I would never be in it". He also told the BBC he had been negotiating with Manor GP, Campos Meta and one existing outfit rumoured to be Brawn GP as he was close to securing a drive the previous season but Barrichello renewed his contract with Brawn.
Rubens Barrichello admitted he was lucky to be driving for Brawn. Barrichello said "I'm just lucky that at this time F1 has changed a little bit". He also wished Bruno the very best in the future, saying he only had a position as Ross Brawn chose the more experienced person because of lack of testing time. He also said he was sure due to Senna's potential that he would get a drive next season.

HRT (2010)

On 30 October 2009, Senna announced that he had signed a deal to race in Formula One in 2010; on 31 October 2009, Adrián Campos confirmed that Senna would be driving for Campos Meta. It was unclear whether Senna still had the drive after the takeover of Campos by José Ramón Carabante, with new team principal Colin Kolles saying the new-look team would need to find extra funding, review the existing operation, and announce the driver line up in due course, with no mention of Senna. On 2 March, Campos announced a name change to Hispania Racing. Two days later, Karun Chandhok was confirmed as Senna's teammate.

On 7 January 2011, HRT announced that Senna would not drive for them during the 2011 season.

Renault (2011)
On 31 January 2011, Senna was announced as a test and reserve driver for the Renault team. On 9 February, the team confirmed that Senna would be sharing testing duties with Nick Heidfeld on the Saturday and Sunday of the four-day test at Jerez. This was to evaluate the drivers in preparation of replacing the injured Robert Kubica for the  season. Heidfeld was given the race seat on 16 February 2011.

On 22 August, Eddie Jordan reported that Senna would replace Nick Heidfeld for the remaining races of the 2011 season. On 24 August this was confirmed by Renault. In Singapore, the Renault cars struggled with grip on the slow street circuit, with Senna qualifying and finishing 15th, ahead of teammate Petrov. Senna finished 16th in Japan, 13th in Korea, and 12th in the first , after being forced to change tyres late in the race. In Abu Dhabi, Senna again finished 16th after receiving a drive-through penalty for ignoring blue flags, and suffering a KERS failure. In the final race of the season, his home race in Brazil, Senna outqualified Petrov for the third time, by starting ninth on the grid. On lap 10 of the race, Senna was involved in a collision with Michael Schumacher, for which Senna received a drive-through penalty, and finished the race in 17th place.

Williams (2012)

On 17 January 2012, Senna was confirmed as a Williams driver, where he was partnered by Venezuelan Pastor Maldonado. As his uncle had been racing for Williams at the time of his death, Senna first sought out his family's blessing before joining the team. He was classified 16th, having completed around 90% of the race distance. On 25 March, Senna scored his first points for Williams at the Malaysian Grand Prix, finishing in sixth place, for which he earned eight points after coming through the field in changeable conditions. Senna's result in Sepang gained more points for the team than Williams had earned throughout the whole of the 2011 season, Senna finished 7th in China and classified 22nd in Bahrain after retiring due to brake issues. Three races later, Maldonado won his first Grand Prix in Spain as Senna retired in a collision with Michael Schumacher. After the race, a fire broke out in the Williams garage. Senna's car was damaged and four crew members were treated for injuries.

Senna finished 10th in Monaco, 17th in Canada and in Europe Senna picked up a drive through penalty after a collision with Kamui Kobayashi, the damage from the collision and the penalty dropped Senna to 22nd and last, Senna finished the race in 11th which became 10th after teammate Maldonado was given a 20-second time penalty after a collision with Lewis Hamilton. In Britain, Senna qualified 15th after he had to slow in his last lap as Romain Grosjean spun in the last corner, he started 13th after grid penalties and after a strong start finished the race in 9th. At the 2012 Belgian Grand Prix Senna scored the first fastest lap of his career after a late puncture dropped him from 8th place to 12th place.

FIA World Endurance Championship and Le Mans return

Aston Martin (2013–2014)
On 5 February 2013, it was confirmed that Senna would be racing for Aston Martin Racing in the FIA World Endurance Championship and the 24 Hours of Le Mans in 2013.

Senna and his co-drivers had a successful start to the championship, winning at Silverstone and then collecting another podium at Spa. At Le Mans, the Aston Martin Vantage GT2 #99 driven by Senna, Rob Bell and Frédéric Makowiecki started from pole position in the GTE class but did not finish the race after serious crash with 5 hours to the end, when running 3rd. Makowiecki had no major injures from the accident. In Brazil at São Paulo there was contact with other cars just in front of Senna resulting in Senna making contact with one of the cars causing suspension damage that forced him to retire from the race.

McLaren (2015–)
On 9 February 2015 it was confirmed that Senna would be a factory driver for the McLaren GT3 project.

Rebellion Racing (2017–2020)

For 2017, Senna joined the Swiss flagged Vaillante Rebellion Racing. Driving the number 13 car in the LMP2 class, Senna and his teammate Julien Canal won the world championship. The LMP2 championship came down to the last race of the season. That final, the six hours of Bahrain, saw Rebellion's #13 (driven by Julien Canal, Bruno Senna, and Nico Prost) and rivals Jackie Chan DC Racing both within one race of clenching the season title. After trailing to their rivals for much of the race, the Rebellion #13 car took the lead. However, with Senna at the wheel, the car suffered a loss of power steering during the final stint. Despite the power steering failure, Senna muscled through for the final 50 minutes of the race to win the race and the championship.

Formula E (2014–2016)

On 26 May 2014, Mahindra Racing confirmed Karun Chandhok and Senna as their Formula E drivers for the 2014–15 season. Senna remained with the team for the 2015–16 season. He did not re-sign ahead of the 2016–17 season and left the series.

Television punditry
On 7 March 2014, Senna was added to Sky Sports F1's line-up for seven races: Malaysia, China, Hungary, Singapore, Russia, USA and Brazil. Senna also commentated during practice sessions alongside David Croft as well as providing race analysis with the presentation day throughout the seven Grand Prix weekends.

Senna also made guest appearances on The F1 Show and operated the Skypad.

On 8 March 2016, Senna was announced as part of Channel 4's Formula One coverage, appearing in special features throughout the season.

Awards
On 15 July 2012, Senna collected the Lorenzo Bandini Trophy in Brisighella, Italy he was the 19th driver to collect the award.

Helmet design
Bruno Senna's helmet is a modified version of his uncle's helmet design: a yellow helmet with a green and blue S shaped stripe. The green stripe has a blue and white outline, while the blue stripe has a green and white outline. There is a green stripe under the chin area and a blue rounded rectangle in the top area.

Personal life
Senna dated Ramóna Kiss, a Hungarian TV presenter and actress, in 2011.

Racing record

Career summary

† As Senna was a guest driver, he was ineligible to score points.

Complete GP2 Series results
(key) (Races in bold indicate pole position; races in italics indicate fastest lap)

Complete GP2 Asia Series results
(key) (Races in italics indicate fastest lap)

Complete Formula One results
(key) (Races in italics indicate fastest lap)

 Did not finish, but was classified as he had completed more than 90% of the race distance.

Complete European Le Mans Series results

Complete 24 Hours of Le Mans results

Complete FIA World Endurance Championship results

Complete WeatherTech SportsCar Championship results

Complete Stock Car Brasil results

† Ineligible for championship points.

Complete Formula E results
(key) (Races in bold indicate pole position; races in italics indicate fastest lap)

† Driver did not finish the race, but was classified as he completed over 75% of the race distance.

Notes and references

External links

 
 
 
 BBC Sport 'Meet the New Senna' 16 July 2008

1983 births
Living people
Brazilian expatriate sportspeople in the United Kingdom
Brazilian Formula One drivers
Brazilian people of Italian descent
Asian Formula Renault Challenge drivers
British Formula Three Championship drivers
European Le Mans Series drivers
Formula BMW UK drivers
GP2 Series drivers
Brazilian GP2 Series drivers
GP2 Asia Series drivers
HRT Formula One drivers
Racing drivers from São Paulo
Porsche Supercup drivers
Renault Formula One drivers
Williams Formula One drivers
24 Hours of Le Mans drivers
American Le Mans Series drivers
FIA World Endurance Championship drivers
Blancpain Endurance Series drivers
Stock Car Brasil drivers
24 Hours of Spa drivers
Brazilian Formula E drivers
Brazilian WeatherTech SportsCar Championship drivers
24 Hours of Daytona drivers
Carlin racing drivers
Double R Racing drivers
Arden International drivers
ISport International drivers
Oreca drivers
Aston Martin Racing drivers
Mahindra Racing drivers
Morand Racing drivers
Rebellion Racing drivers
Extreme Speed Motorsports drivers
United Autosports drivers
Campos Racing drivers
McLaren Racing drivers
Porsche Carrera Cup Germany drivers